This is a list of people from Gdańsk (Danzig).

Early times 

 Conrad Letzkau (ca. 1350 – 1411), mayor, executed by the Teutonic Knights
 Tiedemann Giese (1480–1550), bishop
 Johannes Dantiscus (1485–1548), poet, church canon and bishop
 Bernhard von Reesen (born 1490), businessman painted by Albrecht Dürer

16th C 
 Albrecht Giese (1524–1580), councillor and diplomat
 Caspar Schütz (c. 1540–1594), Prussian historian
 Anton Möller (1563–1611), painter
 Bartholomäus Keckermann (c.1571-1608), writer and Calvinist theologist
 Regina Basilier (1572-1631), German-Swedish merchant banker
 Philipp Clüver (1580–1622) an Early Modern geographer and historian.

17th C 
 Constantia Zierenberg (1605–1653), a singer and musician; daughter of Danzig mayor
 Reinhold Curicke (1610-1667), jurist, historian
 Johannes Hevelius (1611–1687), astronomer.
 Georg Daniel Schultz (1615–1683), painter
 Bogusław Radziwiłł (1620–1669), Prince of Polish-Lithuanian Commonwealth, Reichsfürst of the HRE, governor of Ducal Prussia
 Andreas Schlüter (1659–c.1714), architect and sculptor
 Daniel Ernst Jablonski (1660–1741) a theologian.
 Jacob Theodor Klein (1685–1759), jurist, historian, botanist, mathematician and diplomat
 Daniel Gottlieb Messerschmidt (1685–1735) physician, naturalist, geographer
 Daniel Gabriel Fahrenheit (1686–1736) a physicist, inventor and scientific instrument maker.
 Gottfried Lengnich (1689-1774), jurist, historian

18th C 
 Johann Valentin Haidt (1700-1780), painter and preacher
 Daniel Gralath (1708–1767), physicist and Bürgermeister (mayor) of Danzig
 Louise Adelgunde Gottsched (1713–1762), writer
 Nikita Panin (1718–1783) a Russian statesman and political mentor to Catherine the Great.
 Sir Trevor Corry (1724-1780), diplomat; Baron of Poland; British Consul to Danzig 1745–1780
 Daniel Chodowiecki (1726–1801), artist and painter.
 Adam Kazimierz Czartoryski (1734–1823), Prince, writer, literary and theatre critic.
 Michał Jerzy Poniatowski (1736–1794), primate of Poland
 Johann Wilhelm Archenholz (1741–1812), historian and publicist.
 Avraham Danzig (1748–1820), rabbi
 Georg Forster (1754–1794), naturalist, ethnologist, travel writer, journalist and revolutionary.
 Jacob Kabrun Jr. (1759-1814), merchant, book and art collector, and philanthropist
 Jakob Sigismund Beck (1761–1840) a philosopher.
 Johanna Schopenhauer (1766–1838), author; mother of Arthur Schopenhauer
 Johannes Daniel Falk (1768–1826), poet and educator.
 Antonio Casimir Cartellieri (1772–1807), composer
 Arthur Schopenhauer (1788–1860), philosopher.

19th C 
 Heinrich von Zastrow (1801–1875), general
 Heinrich Wilhelm Zimmerman (1805-1841), portrait painter
 Rachel Meyer (1806-1874), writer
 Joachim Marquardt (1812–1882) an historian and writer on Roman antiquities.
 Eduard Hildebrandt (1818–1868) a landscape painter.
 Ernst Förstemann (1822–1906), historian, mathematician, philologist
 Paul Bronsart von Schellendorf (1832–1891), general, writer.
 Eduard Winkelmann (1838–1896) an historian.
 Stefan Pawlicki (1839–1916), Catholic priest and philosopher
 Fritz von Below (1853–1918), general
 Otto von Below (1857–1944), general
 August von Brandis (1859–1947), artist
 Hugo Münsterberg (1863-1916) psychologist.
 Max Halbe (1865–1944), writer
 Käthe Schirmacher (1865–1930), feminist, writer and journalist
 Max Adalbert (1874–1933), actor
 Alfred Stock (1876–1946), chemist
 Carl Schuricht (1880–1967), conductor
 Marta Wittkowska (1882–1977), contralto opera singer
 Alice Wosikowski (1886–1949), politician, resistance activist
 Gerhard Rose (1896–1992), expert on tropical medicine

1900 - 1945 
 Gerhard Krüger (1908–1994), a Nazi Party student leader
 Hermann Diamanski (1909–1976), German resistance fighter
 Alfred Zeidler (born 1909), German SS concentration camp commandant
 Mathias Goeritz (1915–1990), artist
 Alexander Salkind (1921–1997), film producer
 Wanda Klaff (1922–1946), German Nazi concentration camp overseer executed for war crimes
 Heinz-Hermann Koelle (1922–2011), German-American aeronautical and rocket engineer
 Elisabeth Becker (1923–1946), German SS concentration camp guard executed for war crimes
 Miltiades Caridis (1923–1998), conductor
 Eddi Arent (1925–2013), actor and comedian
 Meir Shamgar (1925–2019), President of the Israel Supreme Court
 Zygmunt Chychła (1926–2009), boxer
 Jack Mandelbaum (born 1926), subject of Surviving Hitler: A Boy in the Nazi Death Camps
 Günter Grass (1927–2015), writer, recipient of 1999 Nobel Prize in Literature
 Henry Rosovsky (born 1927), economist
 Zalman Shoval (born 1930), diplomat and politician
 Wolfgang Völz (1930–2018), actor and voice actor
 Ingrid van Bergen (born 1931), actress
 Jan Strelau (1931–2020), psychologist
 Jutta Meischner (born 1935), classical archeologist
 Holger Czukay (1938–2017), musician
 Wawrzyniec Samp (born 1939), sculptor and graphic artist
 Matthias Habich (born 1940), actor
 Heidrun Mohr-Mayer (1941–2014), jeweler
 Ryszard Horodecki (born 1943), physicist
 Detlev Buchholz (born 1944), theoretical physicist

Since 1945 
 Józef Borzyszkowski (born 1946), historian, politician and Kashubian activist
 Krzysztof Majchrzak (born 1948), film actor
 Jacek Namieśnik (1949–2019), chemist
 Andrzej Szarmach (born 1950), football player
 Krzysztof Kolberger (1950–2011), actor
 Jan de Weryha-Wysoczanski (born 1950), sculptor
 Jadwiga Jankowska-Cieślak (born 1951), film actress
 Jerzy Samp (born 1951), writer and historian
 Bogdan Wojciszke (born 1952), psychologist
 Maciej Żylicz (born 1953), biochemist and molecular biologist
 Tomasz Imieliński (born 1954), computer scientist
 Janina Ochojska (born 1955), humanitarian, social activist and astronomer, founder and director of the Polish Humanitarian Action
 Jolanta Kwaśniewska (born 1955), former First Lady of Poland
 Krzysztof Pastor (born 1956), dancer, choreographer and director of the Polish National Ballet
 Barbara Tuge-Erecińska (born 1956), diplomat
 Pawel Huelle (born 1957), writer and journalist
 Donald Tusk (born 1957), former President of the European Council & Prime Minister of Poland, journalist and historian
 Marek Kamiński (born 1964), traveler
 Paweł Adamowicz (1965–2019), politician, Mayor of Gdańsk
 Aneta Kręglicka (born 1965), model and dancer, Miss World 1989 
 Grzegorz Kacała (born 15 1966), rugby player
 Giennadij Jerszow (born 1967), sculptor
 Dariusz Michalczewski (born 1968), boxer
 Mariusz Podkościelny (born 1968), freestyle swimmer and swimming coach
 Leszek Mozdzer (born 1971), jazz pianist
 Tomasz Wałdoch (born 1971), footballer
 Adam Korol (born 20 August 1974), rower and Olympic champion 
 Sławomir Nowak (born 1974), former Minister of Transport & Construction
 Szymon Roginski (born 1975), photographer
 Agnieszka Chylińska (born 1976), singer-songwriter, actress, author and television personality
 Gregorz Szamotulski (born 1976), footballer
 Jarosław Wałęsa (born 1976), politician, son of Lech Wałęsa
 Adam Darski (born 1977), singer and guitarist, frontman of extreme metal band Behemoth
 Robert Kempiński (born 1977), chess grandmaster
 Tomasz Schafernaker (born 1979), Polish-British meteorologist for BBC Weather
 Jacek Dehnel (1980), writer, poet, translator and painter
 Magdalena Tul (born 1980), singer and composer
 Dawid Tomaszewski (born 1980), fashion designer 
 Jakobe Mansztajn (born 1982), poet, blogger
 Magdalena Frąckowiak (born 1984), model
 Ewa Juszkiewicz (born 1984), painter
 Izu Ugonoh (born 1986), boxer and mixed martial artist
 Oskar Piechota (born 1990), mixed martial artist
 Hania Rani (born 1990), pianist, composer and singer
 Mateusz Biskup (born 1994), rower
 Mateusz Mach (born 1997), entrepreneur and investor
 Mikolaj Oledzki (born 1998), Rugby League player

See also
 Notable members of the Jewish community in Gdańsk

References 

 
Gdansk
People
Gansk